This is a list of the 113 cricketers who have represented Middlesex County Cricket Club in Twenty20 cricket since 2003. 

Those players who have only represented the club in Twenty20 cricket have been highlighted in bold text.

Players are listed in alphabetical order.

A

B

C

D

E

F

G

H

I

J

K

L

M

N

O

P

R

S

T

U

V

W 

List A Twenty20 cricketers
Middlesex
Middlesex cricketers
Middlesex